Cicero Creek is a stream in the U.S. state of Indiana. It is a tributary to the White River.

Cicero Creek was named after Cicero McLaughlin, the son of a surveyor.

The creek has a mean annual discharge of 193 cubic feet per second at Noblesville, Indiana.

References

Rivers of Indiana
Rivers of Hamilton County, Indiana
Rivers of Tipton County, Indiana